Jerome Eugene "Bigfoot" Brailey (born August 20, 1950) is an American drummer, best known for his work with P-Funk, which included the bands Parliament, Funkadelic, and numerous related projects. Brailey is a member of the Rock and Roll Hall of Fame, inducted in 1997 with fifteen other members of Parliament-Funkadelic.

Career
Jerome Brailey started performing around 1968 with the R&B group The Unifics, The Five Stairsteps, then The Chambers Brothers. George Clinton saw Jerome performing with The Chambers Brothers and invited him to join the Funk Mob after witnessing his style and finesse on drums.  He joined the P-Funk collective in 1975 during the time he co-wrote one of Parliament's biggest hits, “Give Up the Funk (Tear the Roof off the Sucker)" with Clinton and Bootsy Collins while also playing on many of Parliament-Funkadelic's most popular recordings.  Brailey left the P-Funk organization in 1978 due to bad management by producer George Clinton and began working closely with Glenn Goins, who had also left P-Funk and started productions on the funk group Quazar which featured Glenn's brother Kevin Goins on vocals.  Brailey and Goins conceived a band called Mutiny as they were finalizing the Quazar album for Arista Records; however, Glenn Goins died in 1978 at the age of 24, leaving Brailey to complete the album. He then established Mutiny and signed to Columbia Records.

“Mutiny on the Mamaship” (Columbia Records) the debut album, follow by “Funk Plus The One” (Columbia Records) both produced by Jerome Brailey while working alongside guitarist Donald “Lenny” Holmes and bassist Raymone Carter were the makings of collectable recordings. The albums were not far removed from the classic P-Funk style, with emphasis placed on dual lead guitar works. They were seen as successful in musical terms, though some critics complained about the lack of originality but the quality of those recordings were recognized by many. Another collection of recordings, “A Night Out With The Boys” (unavailable), Aftershock 2005 (Rykodisc) and Funk Road (Catbone Music Label) all under the group Mutiny's umbrella were introduced to the public with positive vibes and energy.

Jerome is also noted for his drum style on hit recordings such as The Unifics “Court of Love” and The Five Stairsteps “Ooh Child”.  His drum arrangements on the single "Do That Stuff", from the Parliament album The Clones of Dr. Funkenstein, in recent have been sampled by Kendrick Lamar on "The Heart Pt.3 (Will You Let it Die ?), Childish Gambino on “Boogieman" a single taken from his third studio album, "Awaken, My Love" and by Westside Boogie - Outside (ft. Joey Bada$$) for a continuation of drum rudiments lifted from that Parliament-Funkadelic recording.

Sequence, was an American female hip–hop/vocal trio from Columbia, South Carolina, consisted of members Cheryl Cook, Gwendolyn Chisolm, and Angie Brown Stone released the song “Funky Sound” (Tear The Roof Off) on Sugar Hill Records in 1979.  Gerardo “Mo Ritmo” released the single “We Want The Funk” on Interscope Records in 1991 while M.C. Hammer released the single “Turn This Mutha Out", from the "Let's Get It Started" album on Capital Records in 1988.  Also Snoop Dogg on the “Doggystyle” album released his most successful single to date, "Who Am I (What's My Name)?" produced by Dr. Dre on Death Row Records and Interscope Records in 1993.  All or part of the interpolation of these recordings are credited to the original song by Parliament-Funkadelic, “Tear the Roof off the Sucker (Give Up the Funk)".

The Rolling Stone list of “The 100 Greatest Drummers of All Time” chose Jerome “Bigfoot” Brailey as #68 for his steady kick drum, shifty hi-hat action and intricately unpredictable snare patterns.  He also appeared as a session drummer with a diverse group of artists including Keith Richards, Bill Laswell, James Blood Ulmer, Dave Stewart, and Lucky Peterson during his career.

The Mothership, the iconic stage prop made famous by legendary funk collective Parliament-Funkadelic, has been acquired by the Smithsonian's National Museum of African American History and Culture in Washington, DC where it will help anchor a permanent music exhibition at the museum in 2016.  Each year the Grammy Award Hall Of Fame celebrates a class of outstanding recordings at least 25 years old that exhibits qualitative or historical significance and in its 2018 class “Flash Light” by Parliament was add to the Hall list of classic recordings.

Smith and Hay's  release two CD's, Jazz & Jazz (Deluxe) during a series of recordings in 2017 which featured Jerome Bigfoot on many of the songs.  Jazz (Deluxe) charted and became the number one Billboard Jazz album in the country in January 2018.  With a signature for foot and snare connections during the impact years with Parliament-Funkadelic, The Recording Academy awarded and announced in December 2018 that the Grammy Lifetime Achievement Award will be presented to P-Funk members on May 11, 2019 in Los Angeles, CA. for their creative contributions in music.
 
The Rock and Roll Hall of Fame just recently listed the 50 greatest drummers in the Hall naming Jerome Bigfoot #48, revealing his drum style kept Parliament-Funkadelic rooted in the old-school, James Brown-style funk on tracks like "Handcuffs", "Do That Stuff" and the Funk anthem "Give Up the Funk (Tear the Roof Off the Sucker)".

Selected discography

Parliament / Funkadelic (1975 - 1979)
Parliament: Mothership Connection (1975)
Funkadelic: Tales of Kidd Funkadelic (1976)
Funkadelic: Hardcore Jollies (1976)
Parliament: The Clones of Dr. Funkenstein (1976)
Fuzzy Haskins: A Whole Nother Thang (1976)
Parliament: Funkentelechy Vs. the Placebo Syndrome (1977)
Bootsy's Rubber Band: Ahh... The Name Is Bootsy, Baby! (1977)
Eddie Hazel: Games, Dames and Guitar Thangs (1977)
Parliament: Live: P-Funk Earth Tour (1977)
Fred Wesley and the Horny Horns featuring Maceo Parker: A Blow for Me, a Toot to You (1977)
Bootsy's Rubber Band: Bootsy? Player of the Year (1978) 
Funkadelic: One Nation Under a Groove (1978)
The Brides of Funkenstein: Funk or Walk (1978)
Fuzzy Haskins: Radio Active (1978)
Parlet: Pleasure Principle (1978)
Funkadelic: Uncle Jam Wants You (1979)
Fred Wesley And The Horny Horns: Say Blow by Blow Backwards (1979)

QuazarQuazar (1978)

MutinyMutiny on the Mamaship (1979)Funk Plus the One (1980)A Night Out with the Boys (1983)Aftershock 2005 (1996)How's Your Loose Booty? (compilation) (2000)Funk Rd. (2013)Mutiny (2-CD Deluxe Edition)  (2015)

As session musician
Chambers Brothers
"Right Move" (Avco Records 1975)

Five Stairsteps
Five Stairsteps & Cubie Featuring Clarence Jr. – "The Shadow Of Your Love / Bad News" (Buddah Records 1968)
The Five Stairsteps "O-o-h Child" (Buddha Records 1970), Bernard Purdie or J Brailey.

The UnificsSittin In At The Court Of Love (Kapp Records 1968)

Contributions / Compilations
Billy Bass Nelson: Out of the Dark (O.G. Funk) (1993)
Funkadelic: Music for Your Mother (Import / March 1993)
Liu Sola: Blues in the East (1994)
Buckethead: Giant Robot (1994)
Parliament: Greatest Hits 1972-1993 (1994)Bootsy Back in the Day: The Best of Bootsy (1994)
Tawl Ross: a.k.a. Detrimental Vasoline (1995)The Best of Parliament: Give Up the Funk (1995)
Dave Stewart: Greetings from the Gutter (1995)
Jah Wobble: Heaven and Earth (1995)
Peter's Rock Mass Choir: Message from the Rock (1995)
Fred Wesley And The Horny Horns: Final Blow (1995)
Mothership Connection: Newberg Session (1995)
Funkcronomicon: Axiom Funk (1995)
Various Artists: Altered Beats: Assassin Knowledges (1996)
Parliament / Funkadelic (Live): 1976-1993 (1996)
Material: Intonarumori (1998)
Funkadelic: Ultimate (1999)
Eddie Hazel: Rest in P (2000)
Parliament: The 20th Century Masters (2000)
James Blood Ulmer: Blue Blood (2001)
Bootsy Collins: Glory B da' Funk's on Me! (2001)
Parliament: Funked Up: The Very Best of... (2002)
George Clinton / Parliament Funkadelic: Mothership Connection (DVD / 2002)
Snoop Dogg: Undercova Funk (Give Up the Funk) May 2002
Dawn Sheppard: The Dawn Of A New Day (2003)
Lucky Peterson: Black Midnight Sun (2003)
Funkadelic / Motor City Madness: The Ultimate Funkadelic Westbound Compilation (2004)
Funkadelic: Under a Groove (Import / Box Set: March 2004)
Funkadelic: Whole Funk & Nothing But the Funk / Definitive (2005)
Parliament: Gold: Original Recordings Remastered (2005)
Funkadelic: Funk Gets Stronger (Import, Reissued, Remastered / April 2006)
Parliament / Funkadelic: The Mothership Connection Live 1976 (2008)Standing on the Verge: The Best of Funkadelic (2009)Glee: The Music, Volume 3 Showstoppers (Soundtrack Album) (2010)
Parliament: ICON (2011)
Funkadelic: Cosmic Funkers (2011)A Different Kind Of Christmas: Various Artists (2012)
Jonathan Hay, Mike Smith, King Tech, Jerome Bigfoot & Various Artists - When Music Worlds Collide (2015)
Smith and Hay: Jazz (September 2017)
Funkadelic: Reworked By Detroiters (Import / December 2017)
Parliament / Funkadelic: Live...Madison Square Garden 1977 (Import / December 2017)
Smith and Hay: Jazz'' (Deluxe) (Jan. 2018)

References

External links
The Chambers Brothers / Right Move (Discogs) 
Jerome Bigfoot Brailey / Drum Solo Artist (Drum Solo Artist.com)  
The Five Stairsteps / The Show of Your Love 

1950 births
Living people
Musicians from Richmond, Virginia
African-American drummers
American funk drummers
American male drummers
P-Funk members
20th-century American drummers